The Carlson Sparrow is a family of American, high wing, strut-braced, single engine, ultralight aircraft that was designed by Ernst W. Carlson and produced by Carlson Aircraft of East Palestine, Ohio and later Skyline Technologies of Salem, Ohio for amateur construction.

Design and development
First flown in 1987, the original Sparrow Ultralight is a single seater designed as an FAR 103 Ultralight Vehicles compliant aircraft with an empty weight within that category's  empty weight limit, when equipped with a light enough engine. The Sparrow can also be built in the US homebuilt and light-sport aircraft categories.

The aircraft has a 4130 steel tube frame fuselage and a wing constructed with dual aluminium I-beam spars, with stamped aluminum wing ribs, all covered in doped fabric. The wings are supported by V-struts and jury struts. The landing gear is bungee suspended. The Sparrow has a fully enclosed cockpit design, allowing flying in cooler weather. The Sparrow was available as a kit that includes a pre-welded fuselage and quick-build wings. Other lightweight engines employed include the  Zenoah G-25 and the  2si 215.

The Sparrow can be equipped with skis for winter operations. Construction times from the kit are reported to be 400–500 hours.

The design was named Grand Champion at EAA AirVenture Oshkosh upon its introduction in 1987.

Variants
Sparrow Ultralight
Original single seat, high wing, US FAR Part 103 ultralight, with tricycle or conventional landing gear, powered by a  Rotax 277 or homebuilt aircraft powered by  Rotax 503 engine. About 100 were reported flying in 2001. Production completed.
Sparrow II
Two seat side-by-side seating, high wing, US homebuilt development of the single seat Sparrow UL, with tricycle gear and an optional folding wing for transport or storage, powered by a  Rotax 582. Production completed.
Sparrow Sport Special
Single seat, high wing, US homebuilt, with conventional landing gear, powered by a  Rotax 503. Production completed.
Sparrow II XTC
Two seat side-by-side seating with dual controls, high wing, US homebuilt, higher-powered development of the Sparrow II, with tricycle gear, powered by an  Subaru EA-81,  Continental C-85 or  Rotax 912UL. Production completed.

Specifications (Sparrow Ultralight)

See also

References

1980s United States ultralight aircraft
Light-sport aircraft